The 1975 Special Honours in New Zealand was a Special Honours List, published on 18 April 1975, in which New Zealand's outgoing high commissioner to the United Kingdom received a knighthood.

Knight Bachelor
 The Honourable Terence Henderson McCombs  – lately New Zealand high commissioner in the United Kingdom.

References

Special honours
1975 awards